Eli Lilly and Company is an American pharmaceutical company headquartered in Indianapolis, Indiana, with offices in 18 countries. Its products are sold in approximately 125 countries. The company was founded in 1876 by, and named after, Colonel Eli Lilly, a pharmaceutical chemist and veteran of the American Civil War.

As of 2022, Lilly is known for its clinical depression drugs Prozac (fluoxetine) (1986), Cymbalta (duloxetine) (2004), and its antipsychotic medication Zyprexa (olanzapine) (1996), although its primary revenue drivers are the diabetes drugs Humalog (insulin lispro) (1996) and Trulicity (dulaglutide) (2014). Lilly's achievements include being the first company to mass-produce the polio vaccine developed by Jonas Salk, and insulin. It was one of the first pharmaceutical companies to produce human insulin using recombinant DNA including Humulin (insulin medication), Humalog (insulin lispro), and the first approved biosimilar insulin product in the US, Basaglar (insulin glargine).

In 2009 Lilly pleaded guilty for illegally marketing Zyprexa and agreed to pay a $1.415 billion penalty that included criminal fine of $515 million, the largest ever in a healthcare case and the largest criminal fine for an individual corporation ever imposed in a US criminal prosecution of any kind at the time.
As of 1997, it was the largest corporation and the largest charitable benefactor in Indiana. In 2019, the company was ranked 123rd on the Fortune 500. It is ranked 221st on the Forbes Global 2000 list of the largest public companies in the world and 252nd on the Forbes list of America's Best Employers. Lilly is a full member of the Pharmaceutical Research and Manufacturers of America and the European Federation of Pharmaceutical Industries and Associations (EFPIA).

History

Company founder

The company's founder was Colonel Eli Lilly, a pharmaceutical chemist and Union army veteran of the American Civil War. Lilly served as the company president until his death in 1898.

In 1869, after working for drugstores in Indiana, Lilly became a partner in a Paris, Illinois, drugstore with James W. Binford. In 1873, Lilly left the partnership with Binford and returned to Indianapolis. In 1874, Lilly partnered with John F. Johnston and opened a drug manufacturing operation called Johnston and Lilly, but dissolved the partnership in 1876. Lilly used his share of the assets to open his own pharmaceutical manufacturing business in Indianapolis in May 1876. His new business venture became Eli Lilly and Company.

Early days: 1870–1900
On 10 May 1876, Lilly opened his own laboratory in Indianapolis, where he began to manufacture medicinal drugs. The sign outside, above the shop's door, read: "Eli Lilly, Chemist." Lilly began his manufacturing venture with three employees including Lilly's son, Josiah (J. K.).

One of the first medicines that Lilly produced was quinine, a drug used to treat malaria. By the end of 1876, sales reached $4,470. By 1879, the company had grown to $48,000. In 1878, Lilly hired his brother, James, as his first full-time salesman and the subsequent sales team marketed the company's drugs nationally.

The company moved from Pearl Street to larger quarters at 36 South Meridian Street. In 1881, the company moved to its headquarters in Indianapolis's south-side industrial area. Lilly later purchased additional facilities for research and production.

Lilly's first innovation was gelatin-coating for pills and capsules. The company's other early innovations included fruit flavorings and sugarcoated pills, which made the medicines easier to swallow.

In 1881, Lilly formally incorporated the business as Eli Lilly and Company, elected a board of directors, and issued stock to family members and close associates. Colonel Lilly's only son, Josiah (J. K.), a pharmaceutical chemist, graduated from the Philadelphia College of Pharmacy in 1882, and joined the family business as a superintendent of its laboratory after college. J. K. became company president in 1898.

In 1883 the company contracted to mix and sell Succus Alteran, its first widely successful product and one its best sellers. The product was marketed as a "blood purifier" and as a treatment for syphilis, some types of rheumatism, and skin diseases such as eczema and psoriasis. Sales from this product provided funds for Lilly to expand its manufacturing and research facilities. By the late 1880s, Colonel Lilly was one of the Indianapolis area's leading businessmen, whose company had more than one-hundred employees and had $200,000 ($ in 2015 chained dollars) in annual sales.

As the Lilly company grew, other businesses set up operations near the plant on Indianapolis's near south side. The area developed into one of the city's major business and industrial hubs. Lilly's production, manufacturing, research, and administrative operations in Indianapolis eventually occupied a complex of more than two dozen buildings covering a fifteen-block area, as well as production plants along Kentucky Avenue.

Around 1890, Colonel Lilly turned over the day-to-day management of the business to his son, J. K., who ran the company for thirty-four years. Although the 1890s were a tumultuous decade economically, the company flourished and came out stronger than ever. In 1894 Lilly purchased a manufacturing plant to be used solely for creating capsules. The company also made several technological advances in the manufacturing process, including automating its capsule production. Over the next few years the company annually created tens of millions of capsules and pills.

Until the turn of the century, Lilly operated in Indianapolis and the surrounding area as many other pharmaceutical businesses did—manufacturing and selling "sugar-coated pills, fluid extracts, elixirs, and syrups". The company used plants for its raw materials and produced its products by hand. One historian noted, "Although the Indianapolis firm was more careful in making and promoting drugs than the patent medicine men of the era, the company remained ambivalent about scientific research."

In addition to Colonel Lilly, his brother, James, and son, Josiah (J. K.), the growing company employed other Lilly family. Colonel Lilly's cousin, Evan Lilly, was hired as a bookkeeper. As young boys, Lilly's grandsons, Eli and Josiah Jr. (Joe), ran errands and performed other odd jobs. Eli and Joe joined the family business after college. Eventually, each grandson served as company president and chairman of the board.

Josiah (J. K.), Colonel Lilly's son and Eli and Joe's father, inherited the company after Colonel Lilly died and became its president in 1898. At the time of Colonel Lilly's death the company had a product line of 2,005 items and annual sales of more than $300,000 ($ in 2015 chained dollars). Colonel Lilly was a pioneer in the modern pharmaceutical industry, with many of his early innovations later becoming standard practice. His ethical reforms in a trade that was marked by outlandish claims of miracle medicines began a period of rapid advancement in the development of medicinal drugs. J. K. Lilly continued to advocate for federal regulation on medicines. Under J. K.'s leadership, the company introduced scientific management concepts, organized the company's research department, increased its sales force, and began international distribution of its products. In addition J. K. oversaw a large expansion of the company. By 1905 the company reached sales of $1 million ($ in 2015 chained dollars).

Modernization:1900–1940

Just before and after World War I, the Eli Lilly and Company experienced rapid change. Expansion of Lilly's manufacturing facilities at the McCarty Street plant improved production capacity with a new Science Building (Building 14), opened in 1911, and a new capsule plant (Building 15) in 1913. The company also began constructions of the Lilly Biological Laboratories, a research and manufacturing plant on 150 acres near Greenfield, Indiana, in 1913.

In addition to development of new medicines, the company achieved several technological advances, including automation of its production facilities. Lilly was also an innovator in pill capsule manufacturing. It was among the first manufacturers to insert medications into empty gelatin capsules, which provided a more exact dosage. Lilly manufactured capsules for its own needs and sold its excess capacity to others. A 1917 Scientific American article claimed the Lilly operation in Indianapolis was "the largest capsule factory in the world" and was "capable of producing 2.5 million capsules a day". One of Lilly's innovations was fruit flavoring for medicines and sugar-coated pills to make their medicines easier to swallow. Over the next few years the company began to create tens of millions of capsules and pills annually.

Other advances improved plant efficiency and eliminated production errors. Eli Lilly, grandson of the company founder, introduced a method for blueprinting manufacturing tickets in 1909. This process, which created multiples copies of a drug formula, helped eliminate manufacturing and transcription errors. In the 1920s Eli introduced the new concept of straight-line production, where raw materials entered at one end of the facility and the finished product came out the other end, in the company's manufacturing process. Under Eli's supervision, the design for Building 22, a new 5-floor plant that opened in Indianapolis in 1926, implemented the straight-line concept to improve production efficiency and lower production costs. One historian noted, "It was probably the most sophisticated production system in the American pharmaceutical industry." This more efficient manufacturing process also allowed the company to hire a regular workforce. Instead of recalling workers at peak times and laying them off when production demand fell, Lilly's regular workforce produced less-costly medicines in off-peak times using the same manufacturing facilities.

During the 1920s the introduction of new products also brought the company financial success. In 1919 Josiah hired biochemist George Henry Alexander Clowes as director of biochemical research.

In 1921 three University of Toronto scientists, J. J. R. Macleod, Frederick G. Banting, and Charles H. Best, were working on the development of insulin for treatment of diabetes. Clowes proposed a collaboration with the researchers in December 1921, then again March and May 1922. The researchers were hesitant to work with a commercial drug firm, particularly since they had the Connaught Laboratories' non-commercial facilities at hand. Nonetheless, as limits were reached at the scale to which Connaught could produce insulin, Clowes and Eli Lilly met with the researchers in 1922 to negotiate an agreement with the University of Toronto scientists to mass-produce insulin. The collaboration greatly accelerated the large-scale production of the extract.

In 1923, Lilly began selling Iletin (Insulin, Lilly), their tradename for the first commercially available insulin product in the U.S for the treatment of diabetes. Numerous objections were registered by the Insulin Committee of the University of Toronto in regard to Lilly's use of the term "Iletin", although production continued under this name and the objection was later dropped "as a concession".

Banting and Macleod won a Nobel Prize in 1923 for their research, which they subsequently shared with co-discoverers Charles Best and James Collip. Insulin, "the most important drug" in the company's history, did "more than any other" to make Lilly "one of the major pharmaceutical manufacturers in the world." Eli Lilly and Company enjoyed effective monopoly on the sale of insulin in the U.S. for almost two years, until the first of the new American licensees, Frederick Stearns & Co., entered the market in June 1924.

The success of insulin enabled the company to attract well-respected scientists and, with them, make more medical advances. By its fiftieth anniversary in 1926 sales reached $9 million and the company produced more than 2,800 different items.

In 1928, Lilly introduced Liver Extract 343 for the treatment of pernicious anemia, a blood disorder, in a joint venture with two Harvard University scientists, George R. Minot and William P. Murphy. In 1930, Lilly introduced Liver Extract No. 55 in collaboration with George Whipple, a University of Rochester scientist. Minot, Murphy, and Whipple won the 1934 Nobel Prize in medicine for their research.

Despite the economic challenges of the Great Depression, Lilly's sales rose to $13 million in 1932. That same year Eli Lilly, the eldest grandson of Col. Lilly, was named as the company's president to succeed his father, who remained as chairman of the board until 1948. Eli joined the family business in 1909. In his early years at the company Eli was especially interested in improving production efficiency and introduced a number of labor-saving devices. He also introduced scientific management principles and implemented cost-savings measures that modernized the company. In addition Eli was involved in expanding the company's research efforts and collaborations with university researchers.

In 1934, the firm opened two new facilities on the McCarty Street complex: a replica of Lilly's 1876 laboratory and the new Lilly Research Laboratories, "one of the most fully equipped facilities in the world." In the 1930s the company also continued expansion overseas. In 1934, Eli Lilly and Company Limited, the company's first overseas subsidiary was established in England, with headquarters in London and a manufacturing plant in Basingstoke.

Expansion: 1940–1970
World War II brought production at Lilly to a new high with the manufacturing of Merthiolate and penicillin. During the war Lilly also cooperated with the American Red Cross to process blood plasma and by war's end the company had dried over two million pints of blood, "about 20 percent of the United States' total". Merthiolate, first introduced in 1930, was an "anticeptic and germicide" that became a U.S. army "standard issue" during World War II. In the early 1940s Lilly became one of the companies mass-producing penicillin.

International operations expanded even further during World War II. Eli Lilly International Corp. was formed in 1943 as a subsidiary to encourage business trade abroad. By 1948 Lilly employees worked in thirty-five countries, most of them as sales representatives in Latin America, Asia, and Africa.

At the end of World War II the company continued to grow. In 1945, Lilly began a major expansion effort that would include two manufacturing operations in Indianapolis. The company purchased the massive Curtiss-Wright propeller plant on South Kentucky Avenue, west of the company's McCarty Street operation. When renovation was completed in mid-1947, the Kentucky Avenue location manufactured antibiotics and capsules and housed the company's shipping department. By 1948 Lilly employed nearly 7,000 people.

Eli Lilly, who had served as the company's president since 1932, retired from active management of the company in 1948, became chairman of the board, and relinquished the presidency to his brother, Josiah K. Lilly, Jr. (Joe). During Eli's sixteen-year presidency sales rose from $13 million in 1932 to $117 million in 1948. Joe joined the company in 1914 and concentrated on the company's personnel and marketing efforts. He served as company president from 1948 to 1953, then became chairman of the board and remained in that capacity until his death in 1966.

In 1952 the company offered its first public shares of stock. In 1953, Eugene N. Beesley was named the company's new president, the first non-family member to run the company.

Over the next several decades Lilly continued to develop and introduce new drugs to the marketplace. In the 1950s, Lilly introduced two new antibiotics: vancomycin and erythromycin. In addition Lilly was heavily involved in production and distribution of Jonas Salk's poliomyelitis (polio) vaccine.

In 1954, the National Foundation for Infantile Paralysis (NFIP) contracted with five pharmaceutical companies to produce Salk's polio vaccine for clinical trials. These included Lilly as well as Parke, Davis and Company, Cutter Laboratories, Wyeth Laboratories, and Pitman-Moore Company. Lilly's selection to produce the vaccine was, in part, due to its previous experience in collaborations with university researchers. Lilly manufactured 60 percent of the Salk vaccine in 1955.

During the mid-twentieth century Lilly continued to expand its production facilities outside of Indianapolis. In 1950, Lilly began Tippecanoe Laboratories in Lafayette, Indiana, and increased antibiotic production with its patent on erythromycin. In 1954, Lilly formed Elanco Products Company, named after its parent company, for the production of veterinary pharmaceuticals.

In 1969, the company opened a new plant in Clinton, Indiana.

After a company reorganization and transition to non-family management in 1953, Lilly continued to expand its global presence. In the 1960s Lilly operated thirteen affiliate companies outside the United States. In 1962, with an acquisition from Distillers Company, the company established a major factory in Liverpool, England. In 1968, Lilly built its first research facility, the Lilly Research Centre Limited, outside the United States near London, England in Surrey.

1970–present

During the 1970s and 1980s, Eli Lilly and Company saw a flurry of drug production: an antibiotic, Keflex, in 1971; a heart drug, Dobutrex, in 1977; Ceclor, which would become the world's top selling oral antibiotic, in 1979; a leukemia drug, Eldisine; an antiarthritic, Oraflex; and an analgesic, Darvon. When generic drugs flooded the marketplace after the expiration of patents for drugs discovered in the 1950s and 1960s, Lilly diversified into other areas, most notably agricultural chemicals, animal-health products, cosmetics, and medical instruments.

In 1971, the company became a component of the S&P 500 Index.

To further diversify its product line, Lilly made an uncharacteristic, but ultimately profitable move in 1971, when it bought cosmetic manufacturer Elizabeth Arden, Inc. for $38 million. Although the subsidiary continued to lose money for five years after Lilly acquired it, executive management changes at Arden helped turn it into a financial success. By 1982 the subsidiary's "sales were up 90 percent from 1978, with profits doubling to nearly $30 million." Sixteen years after its acquisition, Lilly sold Arden to Fabergé in 1987 for $657 million.

In 1977, Lilly ventured into medical instruments with the acquisition of IVAC Corporation, which manufactures vital signs and intravenous fluid infusion monitoring systems. Lilly also purchased Cardiac Pacemakers Incorporated, a manufacturer of heart pacemakers in 1977. In 1980, Lilly acquired Physio-Control Corporation. Other acquisitions included Advance Cardiovasular Systems Incorporated in 1984, Hybritech in 1986, and Devices for Vascular Intervention, Incorporated in 1989. Lilly acquired Pacific Biotech in 1990 and Origin Medsystems and Heart Rhythm Technologies, Incorporated in 1992. In the early 1990s, Lilly combined these medical equipment companies into a Medical Devices and Diagnostics Division that "contributed about 20 percent" of Lilly's annual revenues.

In 1989, a joint agri-chemical venture between Elanco Products Company and Dow Chemical created DowElanco. In 1997, Lilly sold its 40% share in the company to Dow Chemical for $1.2 billion and the name was changed to Dow AgroSciences.

In 1994, Lilly acquired PCS Systems, a drug delivery business for Health Maintenance Organizations, and later added two similar organizations to its holdings. Lilly purchased PCS, which was the largest U.S. prescription drug benefits manager at the time, for $4 billion.

In 1991, Vaughn Bryson was named CEO of Eli Lilly and Company. During his 20-month tenure, the company reported its first quarterly loss as a publicly traded company. In 1993, Randall L. Tobias, a vice-chairman of AT&T Corporation and Lilly board member, was named Lilly's chairman, president, and CEO after "product and competitive pressures" had "steadily eroded Lilly's stock price since early 1992." Tobias was the first president and CEO recruited from outside of the company. Under Tobias's leadership the company "cut costs and narrowed its mission". Lilly sold companies in its Medical Device and Diagnostics Division, expanded international sales, made new acquisitions, and funded additional research and product development. Sidney Taurel, former chief operating officer of Lilly, was named CEO in 1998, replacing Tobias. Taurel was named chairman in January 1999. In 2000, Lilly reported $10.86 billion in net sales.

In 1998, Lilly formed a joint venture with Icos Corporation (ICOS), a Bothell, Washington-based biotechnology company, to develop and commercialize Cialis, a product for the treatment of erectile dysfunction. In October 2006, Lilly announced its intention to acquire Icos for $2.1 billion, or $32 per share. After its initial attempt to acquire Icos failed under pressure from large institutional shareholders, Lilly revised its offer to $34 per share. Institutional Shareholder Services (ISS), a proxy advisory firm, advised Icos shareholders to reject the proposal as undervalued, but the buyout was approved by Icos shareholders and Lilly completed its acquisition of the company on 29 January 2007. Lilly closed Icos manufacturing operations, terminated nearly 500 Icos employees, and left 127 employees working at the biologics facility. In December 2007, CMC Biopharmaceuticals A/S (CMC), a Copenhagen, Denmark-based provider of contract biomanufacturing services, bought the Bothell-based biologics facility from Lilly and retained the existing 127 employees.

In January 2009, the largest criminal fine in U.S. history, totaling $1.415 billion was imposed on Lilly for illegal marketing of its best-selling product, the atypical antipsychotic medication, Zyprexa.

In January 2011, Boehringer Ingelheim and Eli Lilly and Company announced their global agreement for the joint development and marketing of new APIs for diabetes therapy. Lilly could receive more than $1 billion for their work on the project, while Boehringer Ingelheim could receive more than $800 million from development of the new drugs. Oral anti-diabetic of Boehringer Ingelheim–Linagliptin and BI 10773–and two insulin analogs of Lilly–LY2605541 and LY2963016–were in phase II and III of clinical developmentat that time.

In April 2014, Lilly announced plans to buy Swiss drugmaker Novartis AG's animal health business for $5.4 billion in cash to strengthen and diversify its Elanco unit. Lilly said it planned to fund the deal with about $3.4 billion of cash on hand and $2 billion of loans. As a condition of the acquisition, the Sentinel heartworm treatment would be divested to Virbac in order to avoid a monopoly in a subsector of the heartworm (Dirofilaria immitis) treatment market.

In March 2015, the company announced it would join Hanmi Pharmaceutical in developing and commercialising Hanmi's phase I Bruton's tyrosine kinase inhibitor HM71224 in a deal which could yield $690 million. A day later the company announced another deal with China's Innovent Biologics to co-develop and commercialize at least three of Innovent's treatments over the next decade, in a deal which could generate up to $456 million; the collaboration was subsequently expanded in 2022, according to Innovent. As part of the deal the company will contribute its c-Met monoclonal antibody whilst Innovent will contribute a monoclonal antibody which targets CD-20. The second compound from Innovent is a preclinical immuno-oncology molecule. The following week the company announced it would restart its collaboration with Pfizer surrounding the Phase III trial of Tanezumab. Pfizer is expected to receive an upfront sum of $200 million from the company. In April 2015, the company engaged CBRE Group to sell its biomanufacturing facility in Vacaville, California. The facility resides on a  campus and is one of the largest biopharmaceutical manufacturing centers in the United States.

In January 2017, Elanco Animal Health, a subsidiary of the company completed the acquisition of Boehringer Ingelheim Vetmedica, Inc's (a subsidiary of Boehringer Ingelheim) US feline, canine and rabies vaccines portfolio.

In March 2017, the company acquired CoLucid Pharmaceuticals for $960 million, specifically gaining the late clinical-stage migraine therapy candidate, lasmiditan.

In August 2017, Lilly and Shionogi jointly licensed their product varespladib to Ophirex for the latter's novel snakebite treatment program.

In May 2018, the company acquired Armo Biosciences for $1.6 billion. Days later the company announced it would acquire Aurora kinase A inhibitor developer - AurKa Pharma - and control over the lead compound, AK-01, for up to $575 million.

In January 2019, Lilly announced it would acquire Loxo Oncology for $235 per share—valuing the business at around $8 billion—significantly expanding the business's oncology offerings. The deal would give Lilly Loxo's oral TRK inhibitor, Vitrakvi (larotrectinib), LOXO-292, an oral proto-oncogene receptor tyrosine kinase rearranged during transfection (RET) inhibitor, LOXO-305, an oral Bruton's tyrosine kinase (BTK) inhibitor and LOXO-195, a follow-on TRK inhibitor. In August 2019, Elanco acquired the Bayer animal health business for $7.6 billion.

In January 2020, the company announced its acquisition of Dermira for $1.1 billion, gaining control of two key assets, among others; lebrikizumab and glycopyrronium cloth used to treat hyperhidrosis. In June 2020, the company announced it had begun the world's first study of a potential monoclonal antibody treatment for COVID-19, with a Phase 1 trial of LY-CoV555, in collaboration with Vancouver-based company AbCellera. By August 2020, the challenging aspects of running a clinical trial in a long-term care facility during a pandemic prompted Lilly to create the first of many customized recreational vehicles into mobile research units (MRU) to meet people were they were and support mobile labs and clinical trial material preparation. A trailer truck could escort the MRU with supplies to create an on-site infusion clinic. Lilly deployed the mobile research unit fleet in response to outbreaks of the virus at long-term care facilities across the U.S. In September 2020, Amgen announced that they had partnered with Eli Lilly to manufacture their COVID-19 antibody therapies.

On 7 October 2020, Lilly announced that its cocktail was effective and that it had filed with the Food and Drug Administration for an emergency use authorization (EUA). This was the same day that rival company Regeneron also filed for an EUA for its own monoclonal antibody treatment. In October 2020, Lilly announced it would acquire Disarm Therapeutics at its experimental treatments for axonal degeneration, via SARM1 inhibitors, for $135 million (plus a further $1.225 billion based on regulatory and commercial milestones). In October 2020, Lilly announced that the National Institutes of Health (NIH) ACTIV-3 clinical trial evaluating its monoclonal antibody, bamlanivimab (LYCoV555), found that bamlanivimab was not effective in treating people hospitalized with COVID-19, however data showed bamlanivimab might have been effective in treating COVID-19 by reducing viral load, symptoms and the risk of hospitalization in outpatients. Other studies, including the NIH ACTIV-2 trial and its own BLAZE-1 trial, continued to evaluate bamlanivimab. In November 2020, the U.S. Food and Drug Administration issued an emergency use authorization (EUA) for the investigational monoclonal antibody therapy bamlanivimab for the treatment of mild-to-moderate COVID-19 in adult and pediatric patients. In December 2020, Lilly announced it would acquire Prevail Therapeutics Inc for $1 billion, boosting its pipeline in neurodegenerative disease gene therapies.

On 16 April 2021, the FDA revoked the emergency use authorization (EUA) that allowed and signaled FDA agreement for the investigational monoclonal antibody therapy bamlanivimab, when administered alone, to be used for the treatment of mild-to-moderate COVID-19 in adults and certain pediatric patients. 18 May 2021, the FDA had accepted Lilly's application for Tyvyt (sintilimab), in combination with Lilly's own Alimta (pemetrexed) and platinum chemotherapy for newly diagnosed nonsquamous non-small cell lung cancer. In July 2021, the company announced it would acquire Protomer Technologies for more than $1 billion.

In 2022, distribution of Lilly's COVID-19 antibody drug was paused due to lack of efficacy against the emerging omicron variant. A second COVID-19 monoclonal antibody therapy (bebtelovimab) developed with AbCellera was given Emergency Use Authorization in February 2022, with the U.S. Government committing to a $720 million purchase of up to 600,000 doses. In October, the business announced it would acquire Akouos Inc. for $487 million upfront (a further $123 million deferred). On November 10, after a verified Twitter account posing as Eli Lilly and Co. posted a tweet saying that insulin would now be free, the company lost $15 billion in valuation, after which the company rejected the veracity of the claims.

The company lost upwards of $20 billion in value after a parody Twitter account with a verified checkmark (this was because the account had subscribed to Twitter Blue, which during that time verified all paying users) tweeted in November 2022 that all sales of insulin were immediately ending. As a result of public pressure and increased competition from entities like Mark Cuban Cost Plus Drug, the state of California, and the Inflation Reduction Act capping out-of-pocket insulin costs at $35/month for Medicare patients, Eli Lilly was forced to take measures to make insulin more affordable, capping costs and reducing prices to regain trust and market share.

The company's 2023 research and development focus has been reported to be on drugs in the obesity, diabetes, Alzheimer's and autoimmune areas.

Acquisition history

Eli Lilly and Company (Founded 1876)
Eli Lilly and Company
Distillers Company (Acq 1962)
Elizabeth Arden, Inc. (Acq 1971, Sold Fabergé in 1987)
IVAC Corporation (Acq 1977)
Cardiac Pacemakers Inc. (Acq 1977)
Physio-Control Inc (Acq 1980)
Advance Cardiovasular Systems Inc. (Acq 1984)
Hybritech (Acq 1986)
Devices for Vascular Intervention Inc. (Acq 1986)
Pacific Biotech (Acq 1990)
Origin Medsystems (Acq 1992)
Heart Rhythm Technologies, Inc. (Acq 1992)
PCS System (Acq 1994)
Icos Corporation (Acq 2007)
Hypnion, Inc (Acq 2007)
ImClone Systems (Acq 2008)
SGX Pharmaceuticals, Inc (Acq 2008)
Avid Radiopharmaceuticals (Acq 2010)
Alnara Pharmaceuticals (Acq 2010)
CoLucid Pharmaceuticals (Acq 2017)
Armo Biosciences (Acq 2018)
AurKa Pharma (Acq 2018)
Loxo Oncology (Acq 2019)
Disarm Therapeutics (Acq 2020)
Prevail Therapeutics Inc (Acq 2020)
Elanco Products Company (Established 1954 as a division of Eli Lilly and Company)
DowElanco (Established 1989 as joint venture with Dow Chemical, Sold stake 1999 to Dow)
Ivy Animal Health (Acq 2007)
Pfizer Animal Health (Acq 2010)
Janssen Pharmaceutica Animal Health (Acq 2011)
ChemGen Corp (Acq 2012)
Lohmann SE (Acq 2014)
Novartis Animal Health (Acq 2014)
Bayer Animal Health (Acq 2019)
Protomer Technologies (Acq 2021)
Akouos Inc (Acq 2022)

Collaborative research
Eli Lilly and Company has a long history of collaboration with research scientists. In 1886 Ernest G. Eberhardt, a chemist, joined the company as its first full-time research scientist. Lilly also hired two botanists, Walter H. Evans and John S. Wright, to join its early research efforts. After World War I the company's expanded production facilities and introduction of new management methods set the stage for Lilly's next crucial phase—its "aggressive entry into scientific research and development." The first big step came in 1919 when Josiah Lilly hired biochemist George Henry Alexander Clowes as director of biochemical research. Clowes had extensive medical research expertise and links to the scientific research community, which led to the company's collaborations with researchers in the U.S. and elsewhere. Clowes's first major collaboration with researchers who developed insulin at the University of Toronto significantly impacted the company's future. Lilly's success with insulin production secured the company's position as a leading research-based pharmaceutical manufacturer, allowing it to attract and hire more research scientists and to collaborate with other universities in additional medical research. In 1934 the company built a new research laboratory in Indianapolis. As part of its research and product development process Lilly also conducted clinical studies at Indianapolis City Hospital (Wishard Memorial Hospital). Lilly continues to conduct clinical studies to test medications before their introduction to the market. In 1949 Eli Lilly actually went into partnership with the United States Army Reserve setting up a local Strategic Intelligence Research and Analysis (SIRA)Unit to allow employees to research company data for the Scientific Logistics and Eurasian fields of study (source: declassified Defense Intelligence Agency document MDR -0191-2008 dated 17 September 2012). In 1998 the company dedicated new laboratories for clinical research at the Indiana University Medical Center in Indianapolis.

Publicly funded research
In addition to internal research and development activities, Lilly is also involved in publicly funded research projects with other industrial and academic partners. One example in the area of non-clinical safety assessment is the InnoMed PredTox, a collaboration with pharmaceutical companies, research organizations, and the European Commission to improve the safety of drugs. In 2008 this consortium, which included Lilly S.A. (Switzerland), secured an €8 million budget for a 40-month project that was coordinated by the European Federation of Pharmaceutical Industries and Associations (EFPIA), an organization who represents the research-based pharmaceutical industry and biotech companies operating in Europe. In 2008 Lilly's activities included research projects within the framework of the Innovative Medicines Initiative, a public-private research initiative in Europe that is a joint effort of the EFPIA and the European Commission.

Public-private engagement

Academia 

 Northern Ontario School of Medicine (NOSM) - Donor.
 Population Health Research Institute (PHRI) at McMaster University - Partner.
 University of Toronto - Donor to the Boundless Campaign, and member of the President's Circle.
 University of Washington - Member of the Honor Roll of Donors, having contributed between $10 million and $50 million to funding the school as of 2020.

Conferences and summits 
 World Neuroscience Innovation Forum – stakeholder sponsor

Media 
 National Press Foundation – donor

Medical societies 
 American Society of Hematology – sponsor
 Arthritis Society - National partner
 Endocrine Society - Corporate Liaison Board member
 European Society of Cardiology - Sponsor of the EURObservational Research Programme

Non-governmental organizations 
 HOPE Worldwide - Partner

Political lobbying 
 Alliance for Competitive Taxation - Member
 BIOTECanada - Member company. BIOTECanada lobbies the Canadian government for policies favourable to the pharmaceutical industry.
 Foundation for the National Institutes of Health (FNIH) - Donor. Eli Lilly has given between $5,000,000 and $9,999,999 to the between 1997 and 2020, contributing to funding the activities of the National Institutes of Health.
 Innovative Medicines Canada - Member. IMC is an association of pharmaceutical companies doing business in Canada. The group lobbies the Government of Ontario and House of Commons of Canada through Rubicon Strategy, a firm owned by Progressive Conservative Party of Ontario campaign manager Kory Teneycke.
 International Federation of Pharmaceutical Manufacturers & Associations - Member.
 National Health Council (NHC) - Member organization. NHC is a non-profit organization that lobbies the U.S. Government on issues related to healthcare reform.
 National Pharmaceutical Council (NPC) - Member company. NPC is a non-profit that advocates for expanded research funding and innovation.
 Personalized Medicine Coalition (PMC) - Member. PMC is a lobbying group with ties to members of the United States Congress.
 Pharmaceutical Research and Manufacturers of America (PhRMA) - Member company. PhRMA is a trade association that lobbies the U.S. Government on behalf of the pharmaceutical industry.
 Research!America - Member organization. Research!America is a medical research advocacy group.

Professional associations 

 AdvaMed - Member.
 Canadian Rheumatology Association - Sponsor.
 Canadian Urological Association - Sponsor.
 Mood Disorders Association of Ontario (MDAO) - Donor.

Public health 

 Centre for Addiction and Mental Health (CAMH) - Donor.
 Hospital for Sick Children (SickKids) - Donor to the SickKids Foundation.
 Princess Margaret Cancer Centre (PMCC) - Conference sponsor, and donor to the Princess Margaret Cancer Foundation.
 Scarborough Health Network (SHN) - Donor to the SHN Foundation.
 Sinai Health Foundation - Donor. The foundation funds Mount Sinai Hospital, Bridgepoint Active Healthcare, and the Lunenfeld-Tanenbaum Research Institute in Toronto, Ontario.
 Sunnybrook Health Sciences Centre - Donor.

Research and development 

 Arthritis Australia - Sponsor.
 BioFIT - Sponsor. BioFIT holds events to connect academia, pharmaceutical companies, and investors in the field of life sciences and biotechnology.
 Canadian Consortium on Neurodegeneration and Aging - Partner organization.
 Colorectal Cancer Canada - Sponsor.
 COVID-19 Therapeutics Accelerator - Collaborator.
 Diabetes Canada - Corporate partner.
 GIANT Health - Event sponsor.
 Juvenile Diabetes Research Foundation (JDRF) - Corporate partner.
 New Brunswick Health Research Foundation (NBHRF) - Sponsor.
 Pinnacle Research Group - Sponsor.
 Radcliffe Cardiology - Industry partner.

Pharmaceutical brands
The company's most important products introduced prior to World War II included insulin, which Lilly marketed as Iletin (Insulin, Lilly), Amytal, Merthiolate, ephedrine, and liver extracts. Introduced in 1923, Iletin (Insulin, Lilly) was Lilly's first commercial insulin product.

During World War II Lilly produced penicillins and other antibiotics. In addition to penicillin, other wartime production included "antimalarials," blood plasma, encephalitis vaccine, typhus and influenza vaccine, gas gangrene antitoxin, Merthiolate, and Iletin (Insulin, Lilly).

Among the company's more recent pharmaceutical developments are cephalosporin, erythromycin, and Prozac (fluoxetine), a selective serotonin reuptake inhibitor (SSRI) for the treatment of clinical depression. Ceclor, introduced in the 1970s, was an oral cephalosporin antibiotic. Prozac, introduced in the 1980s, quickly became the company's best-selling product for treatment of depression, but Lilly lost its U.S. patent protection for this product in 2001. Among other distinctions, Lilly is the world's largest manufacturer and distributor of medications used in a broad range of psychiatric and mental health-related conditions, including clinical depression, generalized anxiety disorder, narcotic addiction, insomnia, bipolar disorder, schizophrenia, and others.

In March 2023, Eli Lilly announced a $35 cap on the price of monthly insulin to be put in place immediately in order to be in line with the Inflation Reduction Act of 2022.

Historical 
Eli Lilly has focused on patent-protected medicines, with generic manufacturers taking over production of earlier drugs whose patents have expired.

Cialis

In 2003, Eli Lilly introduced Cialis (tadalafil), a competitor to Pfizer's blockbuster Viagra for erectile dysfunction. Cialis maintains an active period of 36 hours, causing it sometimes to be dubbed the "weekend pill". Cialis was developed in a partnership with biotechnology company Icos Corporation. On 18 December 2006, Lilly bought Icos in order to gain full control of the product.

Cymbalta

Another Lilly manufactured anti-depressant, Cymbalta, a serotonin-norepinephrine reuptake inhibitor used predominantly in the treatment of major depressive disorders and generalized anxiety disorder, ranks with Prozac as one of the most financially successful pharmaceuticals in industry history. It is also used in the treatment of fibromyalgia, neuropathy, chronic pain and osteoarthritis.

Gemzar

In 1996, the U.S. Food and Drug Administration approved Gemzar for the treatment of pancreatic cancer. Gemzar is commonly used in the treatment of pancreatic cancer, usually in coordination with 5-FU chemotherapy and radiation therapy. Gemzar also is routinely used in the treatment of non-small cell lung cancer.

Methadone

Eli Lilly was the first distributor of methadone in the United States, an analgesic used frequently in the treatment of heroin, opium and other opioid and narcotic drug addictions. Eli Lilly was able to acquire the right to produce the drug commercially for just $1 because the patent rights of the original patent holders, IG Farben and Farbwerke Hoechst, were not protected after the Allies of World War II seized all German patents, research records and trade names. Eli Lilly introduced the drug to the United States in 1947, marketed under the trade name "Dolophine".

Prozac

Prozac was one of the first therapies in its class to treat clinical depression by blocking the uptake of serotonin within the human brain. Prozac was approved by the U.S. FDA in 1987 for use in treating depression, with generic versions appearing after 2002.

Secobarbital

Eli Lilly has manufactured Secobarbital, a barbiturate derivative with anaesthetic, anticonvulsant, sedative and hypnotic properties. Lilly marketed Secobarbital under the brand name Seconal. Secobarbital is indicated for the treatment of epilepsy, temporary insomnia and as a pre-operative medication to produce anaesthesia and anxiolysis in short surgical, diagnostic, or therapeutic procedures which are minimally painful. With the onset of new therapies for the treatment of these conditions, Secobarbital has been less utilized, and Lilly ceased manufacturing it in 1999.

Secobarbital overdoses
Secobarbital gained considerable attention during the 1970s, when it gained wide popularity as a recreational drug. On 18 September 1970, rock guitarist legend Jimi Hendrix died from a secobarbital overdose. On 22 June 1969, secobarbital overdose was the cause of death of actress Judy Garland. The drug was a central part of the plot of the hugely popular novel Valley of the Dolls (1966) by Jacqueline Susann in which three highly successful Hollywood women each fall victim, in various ways, to the drug. The novel was later released as a film by the same name.

Thiomersal

Eli Lilly has developed the vaccine preservative thiomersal (also called merthiolate and thimerosal). Thiomersal is effective by causing susceptible bacteria to autolyze. Launched in 1930, merthiolate was a mercury-based antiseptic and germicide that "had been formulated at the University of Maryland with support of a Lilly research fellowship." In November 2002, congressional Republicans inserted a provision into a domestic security bill that President George W. Bush signed into a law, protecting Eli Lilly from all suits in the federal courts, alleging that the drug, Thiomersal caused autism and other neurological disorders in children, such that all such matters be heard by a special master appointed for the purpose, rather than regular federal courts. Its toxicology was that it metabolized into ethylmercury (C2H5Hg+) and thiosalicylate, in the body, which was immensely hazardous to developing countries like India.

Zyprexa

Zyprexa (Olanzapine) (for schizophrenia and bipolar disorder, as well as off-label uses) Released in 1996, (see Illegal marketing of Zyprexa) it was the company's best selling drug through 2010, when the patent expired.

Leadership

After three generations of Lilly family leadership under company founder, Col. Eli Lilly, his son, Josiah K. Lilly Sr., and two grandsons, Eli Lilly Jr. and Josiah K. Lilly Jr., the company announced a reorganization in 1944 that prepared the way for future expansion and the eventual separation of company management from its ownership. The large, complex corporation was divided into smaller groups headed by vice presidents and in 1953 Eugene N. Beesley was named the first non-family member to become the company's president.

Although Lilly family members continued to serve as chairman of the board until 1969, Beesley's appointment began the transition to non-family management. In 1972 Richard Donald Wood became Lilly's president and CEO after the retirement of Burton E. Beck. In 1991 Vaughn Bryson became president and CEO and Wood became board chairman. During Bryson's 20-month tenure as Lilly's president and CEO, the company reported its first quarterly loss as a publicly traded company.

Randall L. Tobias, a vice chairman of AT&T Corporation, was named chairman, president, and CEO in June 1993. Tobias, a Lilly board member since 1986, was recruited from outside the company's executive ranks first to replace Lilly's president and CEO, Vaughn Bryson, at Bryson's predecessor and then board chairman Richard Wood's urging and then, in short order, also Wood. Tobias later became the U.S. director of Foreign Assistance and administrator of the U.S. Agency for International Development (USAID), with the rank of ambassador.

Sidney Taurel, former chief operating officer of Lilly, was named CEO in July 1998 to replace Tobias, who retired. Taurel became chairman of the board in January 1999. Taurel retired as CEO on 31 March 2008, but remained as chairman of the board until 31 December 2008. John C. Lechleiter was elected as Lilly's CEO and president, effective 1 April 2008. Lechleiter had served as Lilly's president and chief operating officer since October 2005.

Community service
The Lilly family as well as Eli Lilly and Company has a long history of community service. Around 1890 Col. Lilly turned over operation of the family business to his son, Josiah, who ran the company for the next several decades. Col. Lilly remained active in civic affairs and assisted a number of local organizations, including the Commercial Club of Indianapolis, which later became the Indianapolis Chamber of Commerce, and the Charity Organization Society, a forerunner to the Family Services Association of Central Indiana, an organization supported by United Way. Josiah's sons, Eli and Joe, were also philanthropists who supported numerous cultural and educational organizations.

Josiah Sr. continued his father's civic mindedness and began the company tradition of sending aid to disaster victims. Following the 1906 San Francisco earthquake, the company sent much needed medicine to support recovery efforts and provided relief after the 1936 Johnstown Flood.

In 1917, Lilly Field Hospital 32, named in Josiah's honor, was equipped in Indianapolis and moved overseas to Contrexville, France, during World War I, where it remained in operation until 1919. Throughout World War II, Lilly manufactured more than two hundred products for military use, including aviator survival kits and seasickness medications for the D-Day invasion. In addition Lilly dried more than two million pints of blood plasma by the war's end.

Lilly Endowment

In 1937, Josiah K. Lilly Sr. and his two sons, Eli and Joe, founded the Lilly Endowment, a private charitable foundation, with gifts of Lilly stock. The endowment still owns 11.3% of the company.

Eli Lilly and Company Foundation
The Eli Lilly and Company Foundation, which is separate from the Lilly Endowment, operates as a tax-exempt private charitable foundation that the company established in 1968. The Foundation is funded through Lilly's corporate profits.

Controversies

BGH 

In August 2008, Eli Lilly purchased the right to manufacture bovine growth hormone, used to increase milk production in dairy cattle, from Monsanto. Use of the supplement has become controversial due to the animal ethics and human health concerns.

340B 

In 2021 Eli Lilly filed a court motion against in response to an advisory opinion of the Department of Health and Human Services indicating that Eli Lilly and other drug manufacturers must continue to offer reduced pricing to covered outpatient drugs through pharmacies contracted to hospitals rather than only to the hospitals themselves.

Prozac 

On 14 September 1989, Joseph T. Wesbecker killed eight people and injured twelve before committing suicide. His relatives and victims blamed his actions on the Prozac medication he had begun taking a month prior. The incident set off a chain of lawsuits and public outcries. Lawyers began using Prozac to justify the abnormal behaviors of their clients. Eli Lilly was accused of not doing enough to warn patients and doctors about the adverse effects, which it had described as "activation", years prior to the incident. The link between suicide and antidepressants remains a subject of public and academic dispute.

In October 2004, the FDA added a black box warning to all antidepressant drugs regarding use in children. In 2006, the FDA included adults aged 25 or younger. In February 2018, the FDA ordered an update to the warnings based on statistical evidence from twenty-four trials in which the risk of such events increased from two percent to four percent relative to the placebo trials.

Illegal marketing of Zyprexa 

Eli Lilly has faced many lawsuits from people who claimed they developed diabetes or other diseases after taking olanzapine (branded Zyprexa), an antipsychotic medication, as well as by various governmental entities, insurance companies, and others. Internal documents provided to The New York Times revealed that Lilly had downplayed the risks of Zyprexa. According to the documents, 16 percent of people taking Zyprexa gained more than 66 pounds in their first year, a much larger figure than Eli Lilly had shared with doctors. In 2006, Lilly paid $700 million to settle around 8,000 of these lawsuits, and in early 2007, Lilly settled around 18,000 suits for $500 million, which brought the total Lilly had paid to settle suits related to the drug to $1.2 billion.

In March 2008, Lilly settled a suit with the state of Alaska, and in October 2008, Lilly agreed to pay $62 million to 32 states and the District of Columbia to settle suits brought under state consumer protection laws. In 2009, four sales representatives for Eli Lilly filed separate qui tam lawsuits against the company for illegally marketing Zyprexa for uses not approved by the Food and Drug Administration.

Eli Lilly pleaded guilty to a US federal criminal misdemeanor charge of illegally marketing Zyprexa, actively promoting the drug for off-label uses, particularly for the treatment of dementia in the elderly. The $1.415 billion penalty included an $800 million civil settlement, a $515 million criminal fine, and forfeit assets of $100 million. The US Justice Department said the criminal fine of $515 million was the largest ever in a healthcare case and the largest criminal fine for an individual corporation ever imposed in a US criminal prosecution of any kind. "That was a blemish for us," John C. Lechleiter, CEO of Lilly, said. "We don't ever want that to happen again. We put measures in place to assure that not only do we have the right intentions in integrity and compliance, but we have systems in place to support that." In an internal email, Lechleiter had stated "we must seize the opportunity to expand our work with Zyprexa in this same child-adolescent population" for off-label use.

In January 2020, lawyer James Gottstein published a book titled The Zyprexa Papers summarizing the legal activities surrounding Zyprexa, and their impact on the political landscape of psychiatry and antipsychiatry in the US. The book details of how he obtained the Zyprexa papers, including how Will Hall and a small group of psychiatric survivors untraceably spread the Zyprexa Papers on the Internet and his battles on behalf of Bill Bigley, the psychiatric patient whose ordeal made possible the exposure of the Zyprexa Papers.

Discrimination 
In March 2021, Eli Lilly and Company was accused of sex discrimination by a former lobbyist who claimed she was forced to work in a sexually hostile work environment. The parties involved settled for an undisclosed amount in June 2021.

In September 2021, Eli Lilly and Company was accused in a federal court lawsuit of discriminating against older applicants for sales positions based on their implementation of hiring quotas for millennials.

Canada patent lawsuit 
In September 2013, Eli Lilly sued Canada for violating its obligations to foreign investors under the North American Free Trade Agreement by allowing its courts to invalidate patents for Straterra and Zyprexa. Canadian courts found Straterra's seven-week long study of twenty-two patients, too short and too narrow in scope to qualify for the patent. The Zyprexa patent was invalidated because it had not achieved its promised utility. The company sought damages in the amount of $500 million for lost profits. They ultimately lost the case in 2017.

Illegal marketing of Evista 

Evista is a medication typically used to prevent and treat osteoporosis in postmenopausal women.

In December 2005, Eli Lilly and Company agreed to plead guilty and pay $36 million in connection with the illegal promotion of the drug. Sales representatives were trained to promote Evista for breast cancer and cardiovascular disease, to prompt or bait questions by doctors, and to send them unsolicited letters promoting Evista for unapproved use. The company distributed a videotape in which a sales representative declared that "Evista truly is the best drug for the prevention of all these diseases." Some sales representatives had also been instructed to conceal the disclosure page which stated that the effectiveness of the drug in reducing breast cancer risks had not yet been established.

Insulin pricing 
In January 2019, lawmakers from the United States House of Representatives sent letters to Eli Lilly and other insulin manufacturers asking for explanations for their rapidly raising insulin prices. The annual cost of insulin for people with type 1 diabetes in the U.S. almost doubled from $2,900 to $5,700 over the period from 2012 to 2016.

Renewed attention was brought to Eli Lilly's pricing of insulin on November 10, 2022, after a verified Twitter account impersonating Eli Lilly posted on Twitter that insulin would now be free. This would cost the company $15 billion in valuation. The following year, the company announced that it would be reducing the out-of-pocket price of insulin to $35 a month. The company also stated that it would lower the price of Humalog from $275 a month to $66 and that it would offer insulin glargine at a 78% discount compared to rival company Sanofi. Despite this, the reduced costs will not apply to Eli Lilly's newer brands of insulin, and the company's pricing is still significantly higher than it was several decades prior.

Dobbs and abortion legislation 
In response to the reversal of Roe v. Wade brought on by the Dobbs decision, the state of Indiana went on to pass a near total ban on abortion. Eli Lilly said that this move would make it difficult to attract talent to the state and that it would be forced to look for "more employment growth" elsewhere.

References

Bibliography

External links

Hand book of pharmacy and therapeutics from Science History Institute Digital Collections

 
Companies listed on the New York Stock Exchange
Biotechnology companies of the United States
Manufacturing companies based in Indianapolis
Pharmaceutical companies established in 1876
American companies established in 1876
Technology companies established in 1876
Multinational companies headquartered in the United States
Clinical trial organizations
Companies formerly listed on the Tokyo Stock Exchange
Research and development in the United States
1876 establishments in Indiana
Orphan drug companies
Life sciences industry
Pharmaceutical companies of India